Fear of Rain is a 2021 American psychological thriller film written and directed by Castille Landon and starring Katherine Heigl, Madison Iseman, Israel Broussard, Eugenie Bondurant, and Harry Connick Jr.

It received a limited theatrical release in the United States on February 12, 2021, by Lionsgate.

Plot
17-year-old Rain Burroughs (Madison Iseman) suffers from early on-set schizophrenia and is admitted to hospital following a psychotic episode. She later reveals to her therapist that she has not been taking her medication as it interferes with her ability to paint.

Her mother Michelle (Katherine Heigl) and father John (Harry Connick Jr) are both very supportive, but when Rain returns to school, she is disowned by her friends who make fun of her mental illness. However, a new boy, Caleb (Israel Broussard), notices her and they begin hanging out.

One night while having a bad dream, Rain sees a vision of her teacher Ms McConnell (also her next-door neighbour) dancing with a small child. She wakes up and looks through her bedroom window into Ms McConnell’s attic window, and sees the girl quickly snatched from view. The next morning, Rain and John visit Ms McConnell's and she allows them to search the attic. They find nothing but dolls and mannequins that Ms McConnell claims belonged to her late grandmother. Rain tells Caleb what she saw and he believes her. They later break into her home to find the girl, but they are unsuccessful.

Rain and Caleb search for missing children online and find a missing girl called Malia who Rain says looks just like the girl she saw in the attic. Caleb later learns of Rain's illness and she opens up to him. Michelle starts to question if Caleb is real, or if he is a figment of Rain's imagination. Rain and Caleb attempt to search Ms McConnell's home again but she hears them break a window and calls the police. John gets angry and confronts Rain, insisting she take a dose of her meds. She taunts him by shoving several of her pills in her mouth. John tries to force her to spit them out, when she bites his finger, he slaps her.

The following evening, Rain and Caleb kiss for the first time in her living room. Michelle surprises them, confirming to Rain that Caleb is real, but then he leaves abruptly. The next day at school, Rain sees Caleb is absent and believes she actually invented him in her mind. She goes to see her therapist but she is not there. Rain returns home where she suffers a mental breakdown. Michelle tries to comfort her but Rain lashes out. John then reveals Michelle died three years ago and her presence has been Rain's imagination the whole time.

Hysterical, Rain breaks into Ms McConnell’s home again and makes a further investigation of the attic. She has a vision of her mother and converses with her spirit. Ms McConnell arrives home and sits down to dinner. As Rain tries to sneak out, she sees that the basement door is now locked, but she is able to steal the keys and unlock the door. Rain finds Malia locked in a cage in the basement. When they hear Ms McConnell come down to investigate, Rain hides in the cage with Malia. Ms McConnell tells Rain she wants to help her and will not report her to the police, and that Malia is not real. Rain does not know what to believe, but at that moment, Caleb appears and subdues Ms McConnell, giving Rain and Malia a chance to escape.

John arrives and confirms to Rain that Malia is real, and that she was right all along. Caleb then emerges from the garage and is also confirmed to be real.

Weeks later, Rain is recovering; new medication is working and she has stopped having as many hallucinations. She and John visit Michelle's grave. Later, as Rain is falling asleep in her room, a vision of Michelle sleeps beside her, reassuring her that her mother is forever with her in her memory.

Cast
 Madison Iseman as Rain Burroughs
 Katherine Heigl as Michelle Burroughs
 Israel Broussard as Caleb
 Eugenie Bondurant as Dani McConnell
 Harry Connick Jr. as John Burroughs

Production
Principal photography began in April 2019 in Tampa, Florida, and St. Petersburg, Florida.  In November 2019, it was announced that the film was in post-production.

It was filmed under the title I Saw a Man with Yellow Eyes.

Release

The film was released on February 12, 2021, in selected theaters and digitally. It grossed at least $170,000 domestically after three weekends, after playing at 120 theaters.

Home media

It was released on DVD on February 16, 2021.

Reception
The film has an approval rating of 54% on Rotten Tomatoes based on 13 reviews, with an average rating of 5/10.

Cath Clarke, writing for The Guardian, gave the film a score of 3 stars out of 5, saying that it, "combin[es] a well-intentioned drama about teenage mental illness with a lurid potboiler," though praised Eugenie Bondurant's performance, describing it as "creepy" and "the highlight of the film." She concluded, "Fear of Rain won’t be winning any awards for mental health awareness with its silly hash of psychology, packaging up illness to fit the schlock’n’shock of the story. But there are a couple of ludicrous twists at the end that make it very watchable."

Noel Murray, writing for the Los Angeles Times, praised the cast performances and said that Rain is "legitimately characterized as a person with schizophrenia, persistently plagued by voices and visions," but wrote, "Landon struggles to generate much tension from her plot, which frequently feels contrived. The story jerks its protagonist (and its audience) through several dark and heartbreaking moments, before inevitably landing on a final confrontation with an outcome that’s not too hard to predict". He concluded: "This is ultimately a nuanced character study, awkwardly wedged into a run-of-the-mill genre picture."

David Robb of Slant Magazine gave the film a score of 1 star out of 4, saying that the film portrays mental illness "with all the nuance and insight of Jared Leto in Suicide Squad," and described its approach as being "too cloying and condescending to even be enjoyed as exploitation."

References

External links
 

2021 psychological thriller films
American psychological thriller films
Films shot in Florida
2020s English-language films
Films directed by Castille Landon
2020s American films